Rohan Polanco Emiliano (born 15 October 1998) is a Dominican Republic boxer. He competed in the men's welterweight event at the 2020 Summer Olympics.

Notes

References

External links
 

1998 births
Living people
Dominican Republic male boxers
Olympic boxers of the Dominican Republic
Boxers at the 2020 Summer Olympics
Pan American Games silver medalists for the Dominican Republic
Pan American Games medalists in boxing
Boxers at the 2019 Pan American Games
Medalists at the 2019 Pan American Games
Sportspeople from Santo Domingo
20th-century Dominican Republic people
21st-century Dominican Republic people